Sam Marklund (born January 4, 1993) is a Swedish professional ice hockey player. He is currently under contract with Guildford Flames in the UK's Elite Ice Hockey League (EIHL). Marklund previously played for AIK of the Hockeyallsvenskan (Allsv).

Playing career
Marklund made his Elitserien debut playing with Skellefteå AIK during the 2011–12 Elitserien season. After a productive season in the HockeyAllsvenskan with Timrå IK in the 2015–16 season, Marklund secured a two-year SHL contract with the Växjö Lakers on April 27, 2016.

In 2017, Marklund joined Modo Hockey in the second tier Hockeyallsvenskan for the 2017–18 season. In 2018, Marklund joined AIK.

After spells at AIK IF and VIK Västerås HK, Marklund joined UK EIHL side Guildford Flames for the 2022–23 season.

References

External links

1993 births
Living people
AIK IF players
Asplöven HC players
Guildford Flames players
Modo Hockey players
Skellefteå AIK players
Swedish ice hockey centres
Timrå IK players
Växjö Lakers players
VIK Västerås HK players
People from Skellefteå Municipality
Sportspeople from Västerbotten County